In organic chemistry, thiepine (or thiepin) is an unsaturated seven-membered heterocyclic compound, with six carbon atoms and one sulfur atom.  The parent compound, C6H6S is unstable and is predicted to be antiaromatic.  Bulky derivatives have been isolated and shown by X-ray crystallography to have nonplanar C6S ring.

Theoretical studies suggest that thiepine would eliminate a sulfur atom to form benzene.  The intermediate is this process is the bicycle thianorcaradiene.  In the complex with (η4-C6H6S)Fe(CO)3, the ring is stable.

Benzothiepines have one fused benzene group and dibenzothiepines such as dosulepin and zotepine have two fused benzene groups. Damotepine is another thiepin derivative.

See also
 Thiazepines
 2,3-Dihydrothiepine
 2,7-Dihydrothiepine

References

External links
 
 

Thiepines
Antiaromatic compounds